Solange Gomez Abraham (born December 30, 1988) is an Argentine actress and model who rose to fame in late 2011 after participating in the reality show Gran Hermano, Argentina's version of Big Brother.

Life and career

1988-2010: Early life 

Solange Gómez was born on December 30, 1988, in Tucumán. She was the second child of Ruben Gómez and Norma Abraham. Her sister, Noelia, appeared in several TV shows while Solange was in the house, and said that she was "a wonderful girl, full of life"

Before being famous she graduated and began working as a chef. At the age of 19, she won a beauty contest in Tucumán.

Television 

Solange attended the Big brother's casting in early 2011 and she was finally chosen to participate. The show was first aired on Telefe on December 12, 2011. It was again hosted by Jorge Rial and Solange was the 14th entrance. She quickly became one of the favourite contestants due to some discussions that she had with her housemates. After a difficult nomination she was evicted on April 17, becoming, until now, the women that has survived the longest number of days in a BB edition held in the Western Hemisphere by surviving 127 days. She was the last eliminated.

In September, it was announced that Solange had been cast in the new comedy series Todas a mí, playing the part of Katty, an innocent and bitchy model who lives with other girls in a model agency.

References 

1988 births
Living people
People from Tucumán Province
Argentine television actresses
Argentine female models
Argentine people of Arab descent
Argentine people of Syrian descent
Gran Hermano (Argentine TV series) contestants
21st-century Argentine women